Club Deportivo Toledo, S.A.D. is a Spanish football team based in Toledo, in the autonomous community of Castile-La Mancha. Founded in 1928 it plays in Tercera División RFEF – Group 18, holding home games at Estadio Salto del Caballo, with a seating capacity of 5,500 spectators. 

Home kits consist of green shirts and white shorts.

History
Founded in 1928, Toledo played in regional football and the lower reaches of the national game until earning back-to-back promotions to make the Segunda División for the first time in 1993, under manager Gonzalo Hurtado. The team won a playoff group ahead of Deportivo Alavés, Real Jaén and UE Sant Andreu, and then came fourth in the second tier in 1993–94.

In 1994–95, Toledo reached a best-ever last 16 of the Copa del Rey before losing 3–1 on aggregate to RCD Mallorca. A seven-year spell in the second tier ended with finishing dead last in 1999–2000, but the team had a famous result on 13 December 2000 when they won 2–1 at home to Real Madrid in the last 64 of the cup, before losing by a single goal to visitors Rayo Vallecano in the next round.

Since their 2000 relegation, Toledo have spent over 20 years between the third and fourth tiers. In that time, the team have twice been eliminated from the last 32 of the cup by La Liga opponents: in 2001–02 (3–2 home extra-time loss to Athletic Bilbao) and 2016–17 (4–1 on aggregate to Villarreal CF).

Season to season

7 seasons in Segunda División
14 seasons in Segunda División B
1 season in Segunda División RFEF
42 seasons in Tercera División

Current squad

Notable former players
Note: this list includes players that have played at least 100 league games and/or have reached international status.

Reserve team
Club Deportivo Toledo B is the reserve team of C.D. Toledo, it currently plays in Categorías Regionales.

References

External links
Official website 
Futbolme team profile 
Club & Stadium History at Estadios de España 
La futbolteca team history 

CD Toledo
Football clubs in Castilla–La Mancha
Sport in Toledo, Spain
Companies based in Castilla–La Mancha
Association football clubs established in 1928
1928 establishments in Spain
Segunda División clubs